Yemkanmardi is one of the 224 constituencies in the Karnataka Legislative Assembly of Karnataka a south state of India. Yemkanmardi is also part of Chikkodi Lok Sabha constituency.

Members of Legislative Assembly

See also
 Yemkanmardi
 Belagavi district
 Chikkodi Lok Sabha constituency
 List of constituencies of Karnataka Legislative Assembly

References

Assembly constituencies of Karnataka
Belagavi district